David Dorby (born 18 January 1974) is a Seychellois football player. He is a midfielder on the Seychelles national football team.

See also
Seychelles Football Federation

References

External links

Living people
Seychellois footballers
Seychelles international footballers
1974 births
Place of birth missing (living people)
Association football midfielders
20th-century Seychellois people